Clearwater Lake is a 360-acre lake located in the town of Cassian, Oneida County, Wisconsin, United States. Clearwater Lake is a private lake that is a part of the Clearwater Lake development.

References

Lakes of Oneida County, Wisconsin